Sully railway station served the village of Sully in the Vale of Glamorgan until the 1960s.

History and description
The station was opened by the Taff Vale Railway. In comparison with the lightly built stations elsewhere on the Cadoxton Branch, Sully was a substantial station, with two long platforms linked by a metal footbridge. Each platform has a building, a signal box and a large goods facility. The station was successful in its early years, used by large amounts of tourist traffic.

The Cadoxton branch fell on leaner times in the mid-20th century. Sully closed to goods in 1963. Its signal box was taken out of use in 1965 Passenger closure followed in 1968 when the line was truncated at Penarth .

No trace of the station survives. The site is now occupied by a telephone exchange.

References

Former Taff Vale Railway stations
Disused railway stations in the Vale of Glamorgan
Railway stations in Great Britain opened in 1888
Railway stations in Great Britain closed in 1968
1888 establishments in Wales
1968 disestablishments in Wales